Sheffield, Brightside and Hillsborough is a constituency represented in the House of Commons of the UK Parliament by Gill Furniss, a member of the Labour Party.

History
Following its review of parliamentary representation in South Yorkshire the Boundary Commission for England recommended substantial changes to the constituency boundaries in Sheffield, to add part of the Sheffield Hillsborough to the whole of the Sheffield Brightside constituency (other than a handful of houses in the corner of Walkley). The rest of the Sheffield Hillsborough constituency formed the southern half of the new Penistone and Stocksbridge seat.

The constituency's representative from 2010 to 2015 was David Blunkett, who also represented the predecessor Sheffield Brightside constituency since 1987. Blunkett was a former frontbench senior minister who was a Secretary of State from 1997 until 2005 in the Blair ministry. He served the first four years of government as the Secretary of State for Education and Employment, three years as the Home Secretary and six months as Secretary of State for Work and Pensions. Blunkett retired from Parliament at the 2015 general election after representing Brightside/Brightside and Hillsborough for 28 years, the longest of any MP for the seat. The constituency representative from 2015 was Harry Harpham until he died on 4 February 2016. He was succeeded by his widow, Gill Furniss, who won a by-election on 5 May.

Boundaries

The City of Sheffield wards of Burngreave, Firth Park, Hillsborough, Shiregreen and Brightside, and Southey.

Constituency profile
The last instance of either of the two predecessor seats being held by an MP from a party other than the Labour Party was the period for both before the 1935 general election.   Majorities since World War II have been substantial suggesting a safe seat on historic voting preferences.
In statistics
The constituency consists of Census Output Areas of a local government districts with: a working population whose income is close to and fractionally below the national average and that has higher than average reliance on social housing. At the end of 2012 the unemployment rate in the constituency was the highest of Sheffield's five constituencies at 7.6% of the population claiming jobseekers allowance, compared to the regional average of 4.7%. The borough contributing to the bulk of the seat has a reasonably high 33% of its population without a car, has 24.3% of the population without qualifications and 25.7% with level 4 qualifications or above.  In terms of tenure a lower than average share, 58.3% of homes, are owned outright or on a mortgage by occupants as at the 2011 census across the district.

Members of Parliament

Elections

Elections in the 2010s 

* Served as an MP in the 2005–2010 Parliament

Notes

References

Parliamentary constituencies in Sheffield
Constituencies of the Parliament of the United Kingdom established in 2010